Alhazen is a lunar impact crater that lies near the eastern limb of the Moon's near side. Just to the south-southeast is the crater Hansen, and to the west is the Mare Crisium. The rim of Alhazen is nearly circular, but appears highly oblong when viewed from the Earth due to foreshortening. The inner walls and the crater floor are rugged and irregular. A low ridge joins the south rim of Alhazen with the nearby Hansen. The crater is named after the Arab Muslim scientist, Ibn al-Haytham.

Satellite craters

By convention these features are identified on lunar maps by placing the letter on the side of the crater midpoint that is closest to Alhazen.

References

External links

 The Lunar Crater Alhazen

Impact craters on the Moon
Ibn al-Haytham